Block 21 is a $300 million mixed-use development complex located in the Second Street District of Downtown Austin, Texas.

The complex has been lauded for its eco-friendliness.

References

Buildings and structures in Austin, Texas
Mixed-use developments in Texas